Wulfsige is an Anglo-Saxon name that can refer to a number of people.

 Wulfsige (bishop of Cornwall) (died between 981 and 993).
 Wulfsige of Lichfield (died between 866 and 869), Bishop of Lichfield.
 Wulfsige (bishop of Lichfield) (died 1053), also known as Wulsy.
 Wulfsige of London (died between 909 and 926), Bishop of London.
 Wulfsige of Sherborne (died between 890 and 900), Bishop of Sherborne.
 Wulfsige II (died between 958 and 964), Bishop of Sherborne.
 Wulfsige III (died 1002), Bishop of Sherborne.
 Wulfsige of York (died between 830 and 837), Bishop of York.
 Wulfsige Maur (fl. 942) landowner and possibly Ealdorman of Mercia.

Old English given names